Ettore Trevisan (23 March 1929 – 12 November 2020) was an Italian football manager.

Career

Trevisan started his managerial career with Italian fourth tier side Belluno. At age 31, he was appointed manager of Ethnikos (Piraeus) in the Greek top flight. In 1963, Trevisan was appointed manager of Greek second tier club Olympiacos Volos after receiving an offer from Beşiktaş in the Turkish top flight. In 1965, he was appointed manager of Pordenone in the Italian fourth tier. In 1968, he was appointed manager of Italian third tier team Potenza.

In 1973, Trevisan was appointed manager of Haiti through an agreement between the Haitian and Italian governments, helping them win the 1973 CONCACAF Championship and qualify for the 1974 FIFA World Cup, their only World Cup qualification. In 1974, he returned to Olympiacos Volos in the Greek top flight. In 1967, he was appointed manager of Italian fourth tier outfit Vigor Senigallia. In 1985, Trevisan was appointed manager of Marsala in the Italian sixth tier.

References

1929 births
2020 deaths
Aris Thessaloniki F.C. managers
Sportspeople from Trieste
Expatriate football managers in Greece
Expatriate football managers in Haiti
Haiti national football team managers
Italian expatriate football managers
Italian expatriate sportspeople in Greece
Italian football managers
Italian footballers
Olympiacos Volos F.C. managers
Pordenone Calcio managers
S.E.F. Torres 1903 managers
Serie D managers
Super League Greece managers
S.S.C. Bari players
Ravenna F.C. players
A.C. Cuneo 1905 players
S.S. Teramo Calcio players
S.S.D. Sanremese Calcio players
Ethnikos Piraeus F.C. managers
Niki Volos F.C. managers